Seraphina Nyauma (born 1965) is a retired Kenyan javelin thrower.

She won the gold medal at the 1983 East and Central African Championships, the silver medal at the 1987 All-Africa Games, the gold medal at the 1990 African Championships, the gold medal at the 1991 All-Africa Games and the gold medal at the 1992 African Championships and finished eighth at the 1992 IAAF World Cup.

References

External links
 

1965 births
Living people
Kenyan female javelin throwers
African Games silver medalists for Kenya
African Games gold medalists for Kenya
Athletes (track and field) at the 1987 All-Africa Games
Athletes (track and field) at the 1991 All-Africa Games
African Games medalists in athletics (track and field)